Marian Palát (born 1 June 1977) is a retired Czech football defender. Previously he played in Russia for FC Luch-Energia Vladivostok. Prior to that he played for FK Mladá Boleslav, helping the club reach the third qualifying round of the 2006–07 UEFA Champions League.

References

External links 
 

1977 births
Living people
Czech footballers
Czech First League players
Bohemians 1905 players
FK Mladá Boleslav players
FK Viktoria Žižkov players
FC Luch Vladivostok players
Russian Premier League players
Czech expatriate footballers
Expatriate footballers in Russia
Association football defenders